Gomphus davidi is a species of dragonfly in the family Gomphidae. It is found in Israel, Jordan, Lebanon, Syria, and Turkey. Its natural habitats are swamps, freshwater marshes, ponds, and canals and ditches. It is threatened by habitat loss.

References

Gomphidae
Taxonomy articles created by Polbot
Insects described in 1887